The 1916 Tie Cup Final was the final match to decide the winner of the Tie Cup, the 17th. edition of the international competition organised by the Argentine and Uruguayan Associations together. The final was contested by Argentine side Rosario Central and Uruguayan club Peñarol,

In the match, played at Racing Stadium in Avellaneda, Peñarol beat Rosario Central 3–0 with three goals by José Piendibene, winning the first and only Tie Cup trophy in the history of the club.

Qualified teams

Overview 

Rosario Central earned its place in the final as the winner of 1916 Copa de Competencia Jockey Club, where the team enter.ed directly to semifinals to beat River Plate (1–1, 3–2 in playoff) and Independiente (2–1 in the final at Avellaneda).

The final was held in Estadio Racing Club in Avellaneda on Christmas eve, 24 December 1916. With only 6 minutes of play, José Piendibene ran from the centre spot and passed to right, where José Pérez received the ball and ran to the penalty area where he made a pass that Piendibene headed for the first goal. On 28 minutes, Piendibene headed another ball for the 2–0 (after a pass by Pérez).

In the second half, on 77 minutes Piendibene shot to the goal after dribbling several players of Rosario Central. Perazzo tried to stop the ball but it hit on him with such bad luck that the ball crossed the goal line, becoming the third goal of the match. Therefore, Peñarol won its first Tie Cup title, with José Piendibene as the most valuable player with 3 goals scored.

Match details

References

1916 in Argentine football
1916 in Uruguayan football
Football in Avellaneda